Eilidh Doyle (pronounced AY-lee ; née Child; born 20 February 1987) is a retired British track and field athlete. Originally running as Eilidh Child, she specialised in the 400 metres hurdles outdoors, and the 400 metres flat indoors, as well as the 4 x 400 metres relay on both surfaces. She represented Great Britain at the 2012 Olympic Games in London, and won an Olympic bronze medal in the 4 x 400 metres relay at the 2016 Games in Rio de Janeiro. Individually, she is the 2014 European Champion and a three-time Commonwealth silver medalist (2010, 2014 and 2018) in the 400 metres hurdles.

In a career marked by consistency, longevity and a particular skill in relay running, in which she was twice a European Champion, Doyle is one of the few athletes to have won medals at every senior international championship theoretically available to her. With 17 medals from major championships, Doyle retired as the most decorated Scottish track and field athlete of all time. In addition to her European titles, and Olympic and Commonwealth Games medals, Doyle's honours include three World Championship relay medals (2013, 2015, and 2017), a World Athletics Relays medal in 2015, 2 Diamond League podiums, European Team Championships medals, a Continental Cup medal representing Europe, and individual medals in 400 metres in both World and European Indoor championships.

Doyle reached four global outdoor finals, with a 5th place finish at  the World Championships here strongest placement. As of 31 December 2022, Doyle remained the Scottish record holder for the 400 metres hurdles with 54.09 sec (2016) and the indoor 400 metres with 51.45 sec (2013). Doyle is a seven-time British, four-time Scottish national champion at the time of her retirement.

Career 

Eilidh Child was born in Perth, Scotland. As a youngster, she twice won the U13 Scottish Schools butterfly swimming title. One of her sisters is a writer, the other used to compete at triple jump and her brother is a footballer.

In 2009, Child significantly improved her personal best for the 400m hurdles from 56.84 to 55.32, to finish second at the European U23 Championships in Kaunus, Lithuania, behind fellow British athlete Perri Shakes-Drayton. She also qualified for that year's World Championships in Berlin, reaching the semi-finals. In 2010, she further improved to 55.16 at the London Diamond League in August. Then in October, she won a silver medal at the Commonwealth Games in Delhi in 55.62.

In 2012, Child ran below 55 seconds for the 400 metres hurdles for the first time, with 54.96 on 2 June in Geneva. Two weeks later, she earned Olympic selection, with 55.53 for second behind Shakes-Drayton at the Olympic trials. At the London Olympics, she reached the semi-finals, running 56.02.

She won two medals at the 2013 European Indoor Championships in Gothenburg, with silver in the 400 metres behind teammate Perri Shakes-Drayton, breaking the Scottish indoor record in the process, with 51.45. She then added a gold in the 4x400 m relay. The British quartet of Christine Ohuruogu, Shana Cox, Child, and Shakes-Drayton also improved the UK indoor record to 3:27.56. Outdoors, she broke the Scottish 400 metres hurdles record with 54.22 in Birmingham in June. Then in August, at the World Championships in Moscow, she ran 54.32 in her semi-final to reach the final. In the final she was fifth in 54.86. Alongside Cox, Margaret Adeoye and Ohuruogu, she won a bronze medal in the 4 x 400 metres relay.

Child captained the first ever Scotland team at the Glasgow International match in January 2014. As captain of the GB & NI team at the 2014 World Indoor Championships in Sopot, she won a bronze medal in the 4 x 400 metres relay. 2014 also saw her secure her first 400 metres hurdles British title, and take victory at the first ever IAAF Diamond League meeting in Scotland, the Glasgow Grand Prix. in a European leading time of 54.39.

At the 2014 Commonwealth Games, Child captained the Scottish athletics team to its best medal haul since 1990, winning another silver medal in the 400 m hurdles behind Kaliese Spencer of Jamaica. Two weeks later, at the European Championships in Zürich, she won a gold medal in the 400 m hurdles, running 54.48. She became the first British woman to win the European 400 m hurdles title for 20 years, the previous British winner being Sally Gunnell in 1994.

In May 2016, Child won the 400 metres hurdles at the Doha Diamond League meeting in a time of 54.53 seconds, competing for the first time under her married name, Doyle.

On 15 July 2016, she won the Diamond League meeting in Monaco, setting a new personal best of 54.09 seconds. At the Rio Olympics, she reached the final of the 400 metres hurdles, finishing eighth in 54.61, before going on to win a bronze medal in the 4 x 400 metres relay, the first Scottish Olympic track and field medal since 1988.

In July 2017, it was announced that Doyle had been elected by her team-mates as Captain for the GB Team at the World Championships in London, which included the largest number of Scottish athletes ever selected for a major championships. At the Championships she finished 8th in the final of the 400 m hurdles but would go on to win a silver in the 4×400 m relay.

In winning the silver medal, Doyle surpassed Yvonne Murray as the most decorated Scottish athlete in Olympic World, European and Commonwealth competition.

In 2018, Doyle started the season of well winning a bronze medal at the World Indoor Championships in Birmingham in a seasons best time, despite tearing her calf in the final. Along with Laura Muir, they were the first  Scottish individual medalists at the championships for 25 years.

Chosen by her peers to be the first ever female flag bearer for Scotland (chosen for the opening ceremony) at the Commonwealth Games, she went on to win her third Commonwealth Games silver medal with a time of 54.80 seconds. In August, Doyle made a joint-British record equalling fifth appearance at the European Championships in Berlin

In 2019, Doyle was included in the largest contingent of Scottish athletes to be selected for a British team at a European Indoor Championships for over 50 years.

Retirement 

In August 2019, Doyle announced that she would miss the rest of the season as she was due to have a baby in January 2020, although she planned to return to athletics after the birth.

Doyle announced her retirement in May 2021.

Doyle retired as the most decorated Scottish track and field athlete of all time. She accumulated a total of 17 medals from major championships at Olympic, world, European, and Commonwealth level. If the World Relays and Continental Cup are to be included the medal tally totals 19.

Personal life
Doyle has a degree in Physical Education from Edinburgh University and was formerly a full-time PE teacher at Perth Grammar School until she decided to focus further on her training, allowing her to relocate to Bath.
Doyle is a supporter of Hearts FC where she has a season ticket.  She wears a maroon and white wristband during all her races in support of the club.
In October 2015 she married former 400 metre runner Brian Doyle.

Career achievements

National records

Domestic medals record

International competitions

Circuit wins and titles 
  Diamond League

 400 metres hurdles wins, other events specified in parenthesis

 2014: Glasgow Grand Prix

 2016: Herculis, QAS Grand Prix

Awards and nominations

Notes

References

External links

1987 births
Living people
Sportspeople from Perth, Scotland
British female hurdlers
Scottish female hurdlers
Scottish schoolteachers
Olympic female hurdlers
Olympic athletes of Great Britain
Olympic bronze medallists for Great Britain
Olympic bronze medalists in athletics (track and field)
Athletes (track and field) at the 2012 Summer Olympics
Athletes (track and field) at the 2016 Summer Olympics
Medalists at the 2016 Summer Olympics
Commonwealth Games silver medallists for Scotland
Commonwealth Games medallists in athletics
Athletes (track and field) at the 2010 Commonwealth Games
Athletes (track and field) at the 2014 Commonwealth Games
Athletes (track and field) at the 2018 Commonwealth Games
World Athletics Championships athletes for Great Britain
World Athletics Championships medalists
World Athletics Indoor Championships medalists
European Athletics Championships winners
European Athletics Championships medalists
European Athletics Indoor Championships winners
British Athletics Championships winners
Team Bath track and field athletes
Alumni of the University of Edinburgh
Scottish Olympic medallists
Medallists at the 2018 Commonwealth Games